Starflight may refer to:
Starflight, a science fiction computer game set in the 47th century
Starflight: The Plane That Couldn't Land, a television movie
"Starflight", a song by After the Fire on their album Der Kommissar
 MV-1 Starflight, a passenger aircraft made by Monsted-Vincent
Interstellar travel
 Starflight, the first book in the Starflight duology by Melissa Landers
 Travis County STAR Flight, a public emergency helicopter service in Austin, Texas.